This article lists important figures and events in Malaysian public affairs during the year 2000, together with births and deaths of notable Malaysians.

Incumbent political figures

Federal level
Yang di-Pertuan Agong: Sultan Salahuddin Abdul Aziz Shah
Raja Permaisuri Agong: Tuanku Siti Aishah
Prime Minister: Dato' Sri Dr Mahathir Mohamad
Deputy Prime Minister: Dato' Sri Abdullah Ahmad Badawi
Chief Justice: Eusoff Chin then Mohamed Dzaiddin Abdullah

State level
 Sultan of Johor: Sultan Iskandar
 Sultan of Kedah: Sultan Abdul Halim Muadzam Shah
 Sultan of Kelantan: Sultan Ismail Petra
 Raja of Perlis: 
Tuanku Syed Putra (until 16 April)
Tuanku Syed Sirajuddin (from 17 April)
 Sultan of Perak: Sultan Azlan Shah
 Sultan of Pahang: Sultan Ahmad Shah
 Sultan of Selangor: Tengku Idris Shah (Regent)
 Sultan of Terengganu: Sultan Mizan Zainal Abidin (Deputy Yang di-Pertuan Agong)
 Yang di-Pertuan Besar of Negeri Sembilan: Tuanku Jaafar
 Yang di-Pertua Negeri (Governor) of Penang: Tun Dr Hamdan Sheikh Tahir
 Yang di-Pertua Negeri (Governor) of Malacca: Tun Syed Ahmad Al-Haj bin Syed Mahmud Shahabuddin
 Yang di-Pertua Negeri (Governor) of Sarawak:
 Tun Ahmad Zaidi Adruce Mohammed Noor (until 5 December)
 Tun Abang Muhammad Salahuddin (from 6 December)
 Yang di-Pertua Negeri (Governor) of Sabah: Tun Sakaran Dandai

Events
1 January – Visit Selangor Year 2000 officially began.
1 January – Y2K passed without serious, widespread computer failures, as many experts and businesses had feared.
January – The KLSE Composite Index rose to 1,000 points.
20 February – Kota Kinabalu was granted city status.
31 March–2 April – 2000 Malaysian motorcycle Grand Prix
16 April – Raja of Perlis, Tuanku Syed Putra, died in the National Heart Institute, Kuala Lumpur, aged 79. On 17 April, his son Tengku Syed Sirajuddin was elected as new Raja of Perlis.
23 April – 21 people were kidnapped by the Philippine terrorist group Abu Sayyaf at Sipadan Island, Sabah.
May – Mahsuri's seventh generation, Wan Aishah Wan Nawawi visited Kedah and Langkawi Island.
1 May – Zeti Akhtar Aziz was appointed the seventh governor of Bank Negara Malaysia. She was the first woman to lead the central bank.
1 May – The Malaysian Palm Oil Board (MPOB), a body overseeing the palm oil industry in Malaysia, was formed as a merger between the Palm Oil Research Institute of Malaysia (PORIM) and the Palm Oil Registration and Licensing Authority (PORLA).
25 May–4 June – The 2000 Sukma Games was held in Penang.
June – The Teluk Kemang MP by-election took place, Barisan Nasional (BN) candidate S. Sothinathan winning this by-election.
1 July – The Sauk arms heist in Sauk, Perak. Many of Al-Mau'nah's gang members were arrested.
1 August – The Proton Waja, the very first Malaysian-designed car, was launched.
26 September – The first Malaysian micro satellite Tiung SAT was launched from Baikonur Cosmodrome, Kazakhstan.
10 October – Shah Alam was granted city status.
31 October – Four Malaysians on Singapore Airlines Flight 006 died when the flight attempted to take off from the wrong runway at Chiang Kai-shek International Airport, Taoyuan, Taiwan during a typhoon, resulting in the aircraft crashing into construction equipment on the runway, killing 83 of the 179 occupants aboard.
4 November – Lunas state assemblyman, Dr Joe Fernandez was assassinated in Bukit Mertajam.
29 November – Lunas DUN by-elections took place, Parti Keadilan Nasional candidate, Saifuddin Nasution Ismail winning this by-election.
5 December – Yang di-Pertua Negeri (Governor) of Sarawak, Tun Ahmad Zaidi Adruce Muhammed Noor died at the age of 76. On 22 December, he was replaced by Tun Abang Muhammad Salahuddin as a new Yang di-Pertua Negeri (Governor) of Sarawak.
22 December – The 2000 Federal Territory of Putrajaya Agreement was signed at Istana Negara between Yang di-Pertuan Agong Sultan Salahuddin Abdul Aziz Shah and Tengku Idris Shah (Regent of Selangor).

Births
27 January – Aznie Azmi – Rapper
30 January – Goh Jin Wei – Badminton player
14 March – Pearly Tan – Badminton player 
1 April – Danial Asri – Footballer 
13 April – Ismail Izzani – Singer
17 April – Tee Kai Wun – Badminton player 
16 May – Ng Tze Yong – Badminton player
21 May – Izzy Zulkhazreef – Actor
22 September – Jennis Chia Yee Goon – Actress
2 November – Eoon Qi Xuan – Badminton player

Deaths
 6 January – Along — Vocalist of Spoon band and murder victim
 12 March – Tun Sharifah Rodziah Syed Alwi Barakbah – Wife of the first Malaysian Prime Minister, Tunku Abdul Rahman Putra and First Lady of Malaysia
16 April – Tuanku Syed Putra of Perlis – 3rd Yang di-Pertuan Agong
8 August – Normadiah — Actress
26 September – Tun Mohd Suffian Hashim – Lord President of the Supreme Court of Malaysia
5 December – Tun Ahmad Zaidi Adruce Mohammed Noor – Sarawak state Yang di-Pertua Negeri (Governor)

See also
 2000 
 1999 in Malaysia | 2001 in Malaysia
 History of Malaysia
 List of Malaysian films of 2000

References 

 
Malaysia
Years of the 20th century in Malaysia
Malaysia
2000s in Malaysia